Richard Banks "Rich" Landolt (born 1959) is a retired Rear Admiral of the United States Navy. He currently serves as the Senior Civilian Representative of the Secretary of Defense in Europe and the Defense Advisor to the U.S. Ambassador to NATO.

Military career
Landolt commanded the Amphibious Force for the 7th Fleet (Task Force 76) in Okinawa, Japan.

He has served as a senior fellow on the Chief of Naval Operations Strategic Studies Group.  In addition he also served as the deputy director of the Expeditionary Warfare Division for the United States Navy.

Landolt retired from the U.S. Navy in February 2014.

Post-military career

After his military retirement, Landolt served as the Executive Director of Public Safety for the city of Mobile, Alabama from July 2014 to March 2017.

In August 2017 he was appointed Senior Civilian Representative of Defense Secretary James Mattis in Europe and the Defense Advisor to Permanent Representative of the United States to the North Atlantic Treaty Organization Kay Bailey Hutchison in Brussels, Belgium.

Education
 Bachelor's degree in Political Science from the University of Florida in 1981
 Master's degree in Telecommunications Systems Management from the Naval Postgraduate School in 1987

References

External links

Official Profile
Speech by Landolt

1959 births
Living people
Place of birth missing (living people)
University of Florida alumni
Naval Postgraduate School alumni
Recipients of the Meritorious Service Medal (United States)
Recipients of the Legion of Merit
United States Navy admirals
Recipients of the Defense Superior Service Medal